Alan Doane (born March 3, 1965) is an American politician. He is a member of the Montana House of Representatives, representing the 38th district from 2013 to 2015, and the 36th District, serving from 2015 to 2021. He is a member of the Republican party.

Doane served as a Majority Whip during the 2015-2016 session.

Montana State Legislature

2010 Montana House of Representatives election

2012 Montana House of Representatives election

2014 Montana House of Representatives election

Doane was uncontested in the primary election, having received 2,034 votes.

2016 Montana House of Representatives election

2018 Montana House of Representatives election

Doane was uncontested in the primary election, having received 2,100 votes.

Doane was also uncontested in the general election, having received 3,765 votes.

References

Living people
1965 births
Republican Party members of the Montana House of Representatives
People from Glendive, Montana
21st-century American politicians